Thomas Thompson, D.D. was a priest and academic in the late fifteenth and early sixteenth centuries.

Thompson was educated at Christ's College, Cambridge, graduating B.A. in 1489; MA in 1482; and B.D. in 1502. He held livings at Enfield and Gateley.  He was Master of Christ's from 1508 to 1517 and Vice-Chancellor of the University of Cambridge from 1510 to 1512.

He died in March 1540.

References 

Alumni of Christ's College, Cambridge
Fellows of Christ's College, Cambridge
Masters of Christ's College, Cambridge
Vice-Chancellors of the University of Cambridge
1540 deaths